Frank Wu is an American science fiction and fantasy artist living in Dedham, Massachusetts. He won the Hugo Award for Best Fan Artist four times, in 2004, 2006, 2007 and 2009.

Wu works in many media, including acrylic and digital painting, and created a portrait of a Klingon girl for a documentary about the Klingon language, Earthlings: Ugly Bags of Mostly Water. He is a regular contributor to science fiction webzines, such as The Drink Tank, and in 2009 announced his ultimately unsuccessful candidacy for 2010's TransAtlantic Fan Fund.

Wu is also a filmmaker, having released in 2006 the animated short "The Tragical Historie of Guidolon the Giant Space Chicken". A director's cut of this short was released in 2007, and a full-length version is now in production.

In addition to these activities, Wu holds a PhD in bacterial genetics from University of Wisconsin–Madison, though his day job is in patent law for a pharmaceutical conglomerate. He is also a member of BASFA, the Bay Area Science Fiction Association.

He provided designs for the spaceships as well as the space station N313 for the videogame Revolution 60.  He also co-wrote and produced illustrations for the game's technical manual, The Chessboard Lethologica, which provides more background on the universe, characters and technology of Revolution 60.

Awards

He was nominated for the Hugo Award for Best Fan Artist in 2002 and 2003, and won the award in 2004, 2006, 2007 and 2009; In 2008 he was nominated for a fourth Hugo Award for Best Fan Artist, but declined the nomination. Nominated again in 2009, he accepted and won his fourth Hugo, but used his acceptance speech to encourage future voters to consider other candidates.

He also won the Grand Prize (the Gold Award) in the Illustrators of the Future contest in 2000.

Bibliography

References

External links

 
 Frank Wu article in the Encyclopedia of Science Fiction
 
 Guidolon the Giant Space Chicken Official Website and on YouTube
 
 Home Page of Chris Garcia's "Drink Tank"
 Revolution Raver interview with Frank Wu
 The Art and Science of Spaceship Design I: The Xiezhi from Revolution 60 by Frank Wu 
 Amazing Stories interview with Frank Wu

American artists of Chinese descent
Analog Science Fiction and Fact people
Artists from Dedham, Massachusetts
Fantasy artists
Horror artists
Hugo Award-winning artists
Living people
Place of birth missing (living people)
University of Wisconsin–Madison alumni
Year of birth missing (living people)